The Tap o' Noth is a hill and fort, 8 miles south of Huntly in Aberdeenshire, Scotland at grid reference NJ485293. It is the second highest fort in Scotland and its main feature is its well-preserved vitrified wall which encloses an area of approximately 100 m by 30 m, 0.3 hectares. Archaeological finds from the site include a stone axe head dated to between c. 2000 BC– c.800 BC, and a decorated bronze rein-ring dated to the 1st–3rd century AD. The site has been designated a scheduled ancient monument.

The vitrified fort is the centre of a settlement within another rampart which encloses a much larger area of some 7 hectares. This outer rampart was constructed in the fifth to sixth centuries AD; large scale settlement within the area may date back as far as the third century AD, contemporary with the Pictish culture.

Drone photographs and lidar surveys suggest that there may have been as many as 800 huts, many in groups with a larger hut at the centre of the group. It has been described as the largest known settlement in early-Medieval (post-Roman) Britain.

In the nearby valley, the Pictish image of Rhynie Man on a standing stone has been found on Barflat farm. A post-Roman settlement has been discovered in the valley, with evidence for the consumption of wine from the Mediterranean, the use of glass vessels from western France, and intensive metalwork production. This is interpreted as signs of high social status, possibly with royal connections.

See also

References

External links

Archaeological sites in Aberdeenshire
Hill forts in Scotland
Pictish sites in Scotland
Scheduled Ancient Monuments in Aberdeenshire
Marilyns of Scotland
Mountains and hills of Aberdeenshire